Pontlliw and Tircoed is a community and electoral ward in the north of the City and County of Swansea, Wales. It includes the villages of Pontlliw and Tircoed.

According to the 2011 UK Census Pontlliw and Tircoed had a population of 2,529.

Governance
The community has a Community Council which comprises ten unpaid community councillors from the two villages.

Until 2022 Pontlliw and Tircoed was covered by the Llangyfelach electoral ward for elections to the City and County of Swansea Council. Following a local government boundary review, Pontlliw and Tircoed was separated to become its own electoral ward. The ward elects one county councillor.

References

External links
 Pontlliw and Tircoed Community Council

Communities in Swansea
Swansea electoral wards